The Grapes of Wrath is a 1988 play adapted by Frank Galati from the classic 1939 John Steinbeck novel of the same name, with incidental music by Michael Smith. The play debuted at the Steppenwolf Theatre in Chicago, followed by a May 1989 production at the La Jolla Playhouse in San Diego and a June 1989 production at the Royal National Theatre in London. After eleven previews, the Broadway production, directed by Galati, opened on March 22, 1990 at the Cort Theatre, where it ran for 188 performances. The cast included Gary Sinise, Kathryn Erbe, Terry Kinney, Jeff Perry, Lois Smith, Francis Guinan, and Stephen Bogardus. The play was adapted for television in 1990 for the PBS series American Playhouse.

Awards and nominations 
Awards
 1990 Tony Award for Best Play
 2005 2nd in the Nation for High School Productions

References

External links
 
 
 Steppenwolf Theatre Company Grapes of Wrath production files, 1972-1990 (bulk 1988-1990), held by the Billy Rose Theatre Division, New York Public Library for the Performing Arts

1988 plays
American plays
Broadway plays
Tony Award-winning plays
Plays based on novels
Plays set in Oklahoma
Plays set in California
Adaptations of works by John Steinbeck
Play